Kevin Alejandro Ceceri (born 2 February 1996) is an Argentine professional footballer who plays as a left-back for Chilean club Unión San Felipe.

Career
Ceceri started his Gimnasia y Esgrima senior career in 2016, making his professional debut in the Argentine Primera División on 10 April during a defeat to Belgrano. That was one of four appearances for Ceceri with Gimnasia y Esgrima in 2016, prior to two more during 2016–17. On 4 July 2018, Ceceri completed a move to Segunda División B side Linense of Spain. Despite regularly featuring in pre-season friendlies, notably against the likes of Cádiz, Córdoba and Mallorca, the defender didn't appear in competitive action; he was an unused substitute for a fixture with UCAM Murcia on 26 August, but his contract was terminated soon after.

In June 2019, after a number of months without a club, Ceceri returned to Argentine football with Guillermo Brown of Primera B Nacional. In January 2020, Ceceri signed with Bolivian club Club San José. He made 11 appearances for the club, before the league was suspended due to the COVID-19 pandemic. In October 2020 it was confirmed, that Ceceri had joined Jordanian club Al-Hussein. He made his debut for the club on 19 November 2020. At the end of March 2021, Ceceri returned to his homeland, after signing with Sportivo Desamparados. In January 2022, he joined Unión San Felipe.

Career statistics
.

References

External links

1996 births
Living people
Sportspeople from Buenos Aires Province
Argentine footballers
Association football defenders
Argentine expatriate footballers
Argentine Primera División players
Bolivian Primera División players
Club de Gimnasia y Esgrima La Plata footballers
Real Balompédica Linense footballers
Guillermo Brown footballers
Club San José players
Al-Hussein SC (Irbid) players
Sportivo Desamparados footballers
Unión San Felipe footballers
Expatriate footballers in Spain
Expatriate footballers in Bolivia
Expatriate footballers in Jordan
Expatriate footballers in Chile
Argentine expatriate sportspeople in Spain
Argentine expatriate sportspeople in Bolivia
Argentine expatriate sportspeople in Jordan
Argentine expatriate sportspeople in Chile